Armando Varricchio (born 13 June 1961, Venice, Italy) is the Italian ambassador to Germany. He previously served as Ambassador to Serbia (2009-2012) and Ambassador to the United States of America (2 March 2016 – 2021).

After returning to Italy in 2012 after serving in Serbia, Varricchio was deputy secretary general of the Ministry of Foreign Affairs.

He served as Chief Diplomatic Advisor to the Presidents of the Council of Ministers Enrico Letta and Matteo Renzi, and Deputy Diplomatic Advisor to the President of the Republic, Giorgio Napolitano.

He was awarded the Knight Grand Cross of the Order of Merit of the Italian Republic, Italy's highest award.

After graduating from the University of Padua in 1985 with a degree in International Relations, he entered the Foreign Service in 1986.

Since 2015 he is a member of the Italy-USA Foundation.

Honors
 Order of Merit of the Italian Republic 1st Class / Knight Grand Cross – November 21, 2016

See also 
 Ministry of Foreign Affairs (Italy)
 Foreign relations of Italy

References 

Living people
Ambassadors of Italy to Serbia
Ambassadors of Italy to the United States
Ambassadors of Italy to Germany
Italian diplomats
21st-century diplomats
1961 births
People from Venice
University of Padua alumni
Knights Grand Cross of the Order of Merit of the Italian Republic